Tambja is a genus of colorful sea slugs, dorid nudibranchs, shell-less marine gastropod mollusks in the family Polyceridae.

Biology
These nudibranchs feed on bryozoans.  They have a radula which bears a rachidian tooth whose upper margin is either smooth or notched; the lateral tooth has two crowns, and the other teeth are so flat as to resemble plates.

Species 
Species in the genus Tambja include:

 Tambja abdere Farmer, 1978 - synonym: Tambja fusca
 Tambja affinis (Eliot, 1904)
 Tambja amitina (Bergh, 1905) nomen dubium
 Tambja anayana Ortea, 1989 
 Tambja blacki Pola, Cervera & Gosliner, 2006
 Tambja brasiliensis Pola, Padula, Gosliner & Cervera, 2014
 Tambja caeruleocirrus Willan & Chang, 2017
 Tambja capensis (Bergh, 1907)
 Tambja ceutae Garcia-Gomez & Ortea, 1988
 Tambja crioula Pola, Padula, Gosliner & Cervera, 2014
 Tambja dracomus Willan & Chang, 2017
 Tambja diaphana (Bergh, 1877) - nomen dubium
 Tambja eliora (Er. Marcus & Ev. Marcus, 1967)
 Tambja fantasmalis Ortea & García-Gómez, 1986
 Tambja gabrielae Pola, Cervera, & Gosliner, 2005
 Tambja gratiosa (Bergh, 1890) - synonym: Roboastra gratiosa (Bergh, 1890)
 Tambja haidari Pola, Cervera, & Gosliner, 2006
 Tambja kava Pola, Padula, Gosliner & Cervera, 2014
 Tambja marbellensis (Schick & Cervera, 1998)
 Tambja morosa (Bergh, 1877) - synonym: Tambja kushimotoensis Baba, 1987
 Tambja mullineri Farmer, 1978
 Tambja olivaria Yonow, 1994
 Tambja pulcherrima Willan & Chang, 2017
 Tambja sagamiana (Baba, 1955)
 Tambja simplex Ortea & Moro, 1999
 Tambja stegosauriformis Pola, Cervera, & Gosliner, 2005
 Tambja tenuilineata Miller & Haagh, 2005
 Tambja verconis (Basedow & Hedley, 1905) - type species
 Tambja victoriae Pola, Cervera, & Gosliner, 2005
 Tambja zulu Pola, Cervera, & Gosliner, 2005

The nominal species Tambja amakusana Baba, 1987, T. mediterranea Domínguez, Pola & Ramón, 2015, and T. oliva Meyer, 1977 have been placed in the new genus Martadoris.

References

Polyceridae